Kanchana may refer to:

Media
 Unicorn-Kanchana, British record label
 Kanchana (1952 film), 1952 Indian drama film produced in Telugu, Malayalam and Tamil languages
 Kanchana (2011 film), 2011 Indian Tamil horror comedy film directed by Raghava Lawrence
 Kanchana (2012 TV series), a 2012 Indian Tamil-language soap opera that aired in Vijay TV 
 Kanchana (2015 TV series), the Tamil-language version of the Indian television series Shastri Sisters, that aired on Raj TV in 2015

See also
 Kanchana (name), for people with the name